The ninety-first Cabinet of Bulgaria took office on November 7, 2014. It was a coalition government chaired by Boyko Borisov. The government was formed after Borisov's party, GERB, won the 2014 parliamentary election. As GERB won 84 out of the 240 seats in the National Assembly (a plurality), they were compelled to form a coalition to legally govern.

Formation
After being tasked by President Rosen Plevneliev to form a government, Borisov's GERB allied with the Reformist Bloc to form a government and got support from the Alternative for Bulgarian Revival (partnership agreement with GERB) and also had the outside support of the Patriotic Front. The cabinet of twenty ministers was approved by a majority of 136-97 (with one abstention). Borisov was then chosen as prime minister by an even larger vote of 149-85. Borisov became the first person to be elected twice as Prime Minister in the recent history of Bulgaria. Ministers with Reformist Bloc support are members of Democrats for a Strong Bulgaria, Union of Democratic Forces, Bulgaria for Citizens Movement and Bulgarian Agrarian National Union.

Cabinet

Vuchkov Resignation
On 4 March 2015, the Minister of Interior Veselin Vuchkov resigned. Vuchkov cited the reluctance of PM Borisov to replace the ministry's chief secretary Svetlozar Lazarov and the head of the National Security Agency (DANS) Vladimir Pisanchev. On 11 March, Vuchkov was replaced by Rumyana Bachvarova, who also kept her position as a Deputy PM.

Ivanov Resignation and Protests
On 9 December 2015, the Minister of Justice Hristo Ivanov resigned, stating that the National Assembly had compromised the reforms in the court system by voting an altered version of the proposed amendments in the constitution. Ivanov added that the prime minister Borisov is dependent on the chief prosecutor Sotir Tsatsarov.

The unfulfilled judiciary reform and the resignation of the Minister of Justice sparked protests in Sofia.

On 18 December 2015, Ivanov was replaced by Ekaterina Zakharieva, who had been nominated by the prime minister Borisov.

Tanev Resignation
On 28 January 2016, the prime minister Borisov demanded that the Minister of Education and Science Todor Tanev resign. On 3 February, by a vote of 104-66 Meglena Kuneva was appointed as new minister. She also kept her position as a Deputy PM.

ABV Withdrawal
On 10 May 2016, Ivaylo Kalfin resigned as a Deputy Prime Minister and Minister of Labor and Social Policy. Alternative for Bulgarian Revival also withdrew from the coalition government.

Resignation
On 13 November 2016, after the GERB candidate Tsetska Tsacheva lost the 2016 presidential elections to Rumen Radev, the prime minister Borisov announced that the government will resign. The resignation was approved by the National Assembly on 16 November 2016 by a majority of 218-0 (with 2 abstentions).

See also
First Borisov Government
Third Borisov Government
History of Bulgaria since 1989

References

Bulgarian governments
2014 establishments in Bulgaria
2017 disestablishments in Bulgaria
GERB